Torpedo Boat  is a 1942 American drama film from Pine-Thomas Productions directed by John Rawlins, written by Maxwell Shane, and starring Richard Arlen, Jean Parker, Mary Carlisle, Phillip Terry, Dick Purcell and Ralph Sanford. It was released on January 24, 1942, by Paramount Pictures.

Plot

Cast 
Richard Arlen as Skinner Barnes
Jean Parker as Grace Holman
Mary Carlisle as Jane Townsend
Phillip Terry as Tommy Whelan
Dick Purcell as Ralph Andrews
Ralph Sanford as Hector Bobry
Oscar O'Shea as Captain Mike
Robert Middlemass as Mr. Townsend
Warren Hymer as Marine
William Haade as Big Sweeney, Riveter
Virginia Sale as Mrs. Sweeney

Production
The film was based on an original story by Alex Gottlieb. Pine-Thomas Productions bought it in May 1941 and assigned Richard Arlen to star.

Filming started October 1941. Arlen had made three films for Pine-Thomas, who then signed a new three-film contract with the actor; this was the first movie under that contract and the first to not deal with an aviation theme.

Frances Farmer was supposed to play the female lead but she was then put in Son of Fury (1942). She was replaced by Jean Parker who had made a number of films for Pine-Thomas.

The film was shot before America's entry into World War Two but released afterwards. In January 1942 the Los Angeles Times wrote it was "one of those modest Pine Thomas affairs which might have slipped by without a ripple a month ago but which today sound like prophecy."

In particular the film attracted attention for a scene where an old ship was converted into a fighter with planes on top and torpedo boats below; the planes would scout for the enemy and then the boats would attack. Screenwriters Maxwell Shane and Richard Murphy made up this concept but then Chairman Carl Vinson of the House Naval Affairs Committee proposed a similar idea. Pine-Thomas sent a copy of the film to the committee and arranged for the film to be released earlier.

References

External links 
 
Torpedo Boat at TCMDB
Torpedo Boat at BFI

1942 films
Paramount Pictures films
American drama films
1942 drama films
Films directed by John Rawlins
American black-and-white films
1940s English-language films
1940s American films